Mystic Theatre may refer to:
 Mystic Theatre (album), by Mark Olson, Victoria Williams and the Original Harmony Ridge Creekdippers
Mystic Theatre (Petaluma, California), historic building and live music venue
 Mystic Theatre (Marmarth, North Dakota), listed on the NRHP